The Fram Formation is an Upper Devonian (Frasnian) sequence of rock strata on Ellesmere Island that came into prominence in 2006 with the discovery in its rocks of examples of the transitional fossil, Tiktaalik, a sarcopterygian or lobe-finned fish showing many tetrapod characteristics. Fossils of Laccognathus embryi, a porolepiform lobe-finned fish, and Qikiqtania, a close relative of Tiktaalik, were also found in the formation. The Fram Formation is a Middle to Upper Devonian clastic wedge forming an extensive continental facies consisting of sediments derived from deposits laid down in braided stream systems that formed some 375 million years ago, at a time when the North American craton ("Laurentia") was straddling the equator.

Paleobiota

Vertebrates

See also

 List of fossiliferous stratigraphic units in Nunavut
 Escuminac Formation, another Frasnian-aged formation known for its sarcopterygian fossils.

References

Edward B. Daeschler, Neil H. Shubin and  Farish A. Jenkins Jr, 2006. "A Devonian tetrapod-like fish and the evolution of the tetrapod body plan" Nature, April 2006, pp 757ff (pdf file)  

Fram Formation
Fluvial deposits
Devonian southern paleotropical deposits
Upper Devonian Series